The EN postcode area, also known as the Enfield postcode area, is a group of eleven postcode districts in England, within seven post towns. These cover parts of northern Greater London (including Enfield and Barnet), southern Hertfordshire (including Potters Bar, Waltham Cross, Broxbourne and Hoddesdon) and western Essex (including Waltham Abbey).



Postal administration
Mail for this area is sorted at the Home Counties North Mail Centre in Hemel Hempstead, and is delivered from offices in Enfield (Southbury Road EN1), Barnet (Longmore Avenue EN5), Potters Bar (Darkes Lane EN6), Waltham Cross (Eleanor Cross Road EN8) and Hoddesdon (Conduit Lane EN11). The area served includes the northern parts of the London Boroughs of Enfield and Barnet, the eastern part of the Hertsmere district of Hertfordshire, the southern part of the Welwyn Hatfield district and virtually all of the borough of Broxbourne, while EN9 and small parts of EN10 and EN11 cover the western part of the Epping Forest district of Essex.

List of postcode districts
The approximate coverage of the postcode districts:

|-
! EN1
| ENFIELD
| Bush Hill Park; eastern parts of Bulls Cross, Enfield Town, Forty Hill, outskirts of Lower Edmonton, Enfield Highway, Southbury
| Enfield
|-
! EN2
| ENFIELD
| Botany Bay, Clay Hill, Crews Hill; western parts of Bulls Cross, Enfield Chase, Enfield Town, Forty Hill, Gordon Hill
| Enfield
|-
! EN3
| ENFIELD
| Enfield Highway, Enfield Island Village, Enfield Lock, Enfield Wash, Ponders End, outskirts of Southbury

| Enfield
|-
! EN4
| BARNET
| Hadley Wood, Cockfosters, East Barnet, New Barnet
| Barnet, Enfield
|-
! EN5
| BARNET
| High Barnet, Arkley
| Barnet, Hertsmere
|-
! EN6
| POTTERS BAR
| Potters Bar, South Mimms, Cuffley, Northaw
| Hertsmere, Welwyn Hatfield
|-
! EN7
| WALTHAM CROSS
| Cheshunt, Goffs Oak, Capel Manor College
| Broxbourne, Enfield
|-
! EN8
| WALTHAM CROSS
| Waltham Cross, Cheshunt, Bullsmoor
| Broxbourne, Enfield
|-
! EN9
| WALTHAM ABBEY
| Waltham Abbey, Nazeing, Upshire
| Epping Forest
|-
! EN10
| BROXBOURNE
| Broxbourne, Wormley, Turnford
| Broxbourne, Epping Forest
|-
! EN11
| HODDESDON
| Hoddesdon, Dobbs Weir
| Broxbourne, Epping Forest
|}

Map

See also
Edmonton Hundred, this obsolete division has a map showing its parishes, the largest of which was always Enfield alike to the ENFIELD post town, and its bulk mirrors EN1 to EN3 and EN6
Postcode Address File
 List of postcode areas in the United Kingdom

References

External links
Royal Mail's Postcode Address File
A quick introduction to Royal Mail's Postcode Address File (PAF)

Postcode areas covering London
Postcode areas covering the East of England
Media and communications in the London Borough of Enfield
Media and communications in the London Borough of Barnet
Hertsmere
Epping Forest District
Borough of Broxbourne
Welwyn Hatfield